The 160th Anti-Aircraft Artillery Brigade is a formation of the Ukrainian Air Force. The full name of the Brigade is the 160th Warsaw-Odessa Order of Suvorov 3rd degree Anti-Aircraft Artillery Brigade.. The Brigade is considered to be one of the best Anti-Aircraft Artillery units in Ukraine.

The 160th Brigade was part of the 21st Air Defence Division (1961-1989) and then the 60th Air Defence Corps from 1989-1992, both part of the 8th Air Defence Army. From 1961-92 it was located at Odessa.

History
In 1999 the Brigade was given the honorable name "Odesa" for exhibiting high level of professionalism in protecting the skies over Odesa. The brigade was also awarded with its first Colour by the President of Ukraine.

Awards
1944 received the honorable name «Warsaw»
1945 received the Order of Suvorov Third Class for its actions near Berlin
1999 received the honorable name «Odesa»

Past commanders
Lieutenant Colonel Mykola Oleshiuk

References

Air force brigades of Ukraine
Air defence brigades
Military units and formations established in 1941